The Val de Saire (or Vale of the River Saire) is an area situated in the north of the Cotentin Peninsula, to the east of Cherbourg in the French region of Lower Normandy. To the south lies the Plain. It is named after the river Saire, which flows from Mesnil-au-Val into the English Channel between Réville and Saint-Vaast-la-Hougue.

The region is renowned for its seafood, in particular the oysters from around Saint-Vaast-la-Hougue and Tatihou, which are said to have a nutty flavour, and for the mussels fished off the coast of Barfleur, known as Blondes de Barfleur.

Places of interest
Barfleur harbour
Phare de Gatteville or Pointe de Barfleur Light, an active lighthouse at the tip of Barfleur
Saint-Vaast-la-Hougue harbour
Tatihou island

External links
Information website about the Val de Saire in English

Geography of Manche
Landforms of Normandy